War Party is a 1965 American Western film directed by Lesley Selander, written by William Marks and George Williams, and starring Michael T. Mikler, Davey Davison, Don "Red" Barry, Laurie Mock, Dennis Robertson and Charles Horvath. It was released on March 1, 1965, by 20th Century Fox.

Plot

Cast 
Michael T. Mikler as Johnny Hawk
Davey Davison as Sarah Lundeen
Don "Red" Barry as Sgt. Chaney
Laurie Mock as Nicoma
Dennis Robertson as Trooper
Charles Horvath as Wolf Hound
Guy Wilkerson as Wooden Face
Michael Carr as Trooper
Fred Krone as Indian

See also
List of American films of 1965

References

External links 
 

1965 films
1960s English-language films
20th Century Fox films
American Western (genre) films
1965 Western (genre) films
Films directed by Lesley Selander
Films scored by Richard LaSalle
1960s American films